The Arkansas Razorbacks football team competes in the National Collegiate Athletic Association (NCAA) Division I Football Bowl Subdivision (FBS) representing the University of Arkansas in Fayetteville, Arkansas.

The University of Arkansas has continuously fielded an intercollegiate football team since the 1894 college football season. From 1894 to 1909, the team was known as the "Cardinals" and the school's mascot was a redbird. The team's name and mascot changed for the 1910 season after head coach Hugo Bezdek proclaimed the undefeated 1909 team played "like a wild band of razorback hogs."

The Razorbacks have been a member of only two athletic conferences. From 1894 through 1914, Arkansas competed as a football independent without any conference affiliation. In 1915, the Razorbacks became a charter member of the Southwest Conference (SWC). Arkansas won 13 conference championships before withdrawing from the SWC after the 1991 season. The Razorbacks became a charter member of the Western Division of the Southeastern Conference (SEC) in 1992. Since joining the SEC, the Razorbacks have won 4 division titles and appeared in the SEC Championship Game 3 times.

The Razorbacks have competed in 44 bowl games, the first was a tie in the 1934 Dixie Classic against Centenary College of Louisiana. The Razorbacks' first bowl game win came against the William & Mary Indians in the Dixie Bowl. The Razorbacks have received votes in the final rankings of the AP Poll in 28 seasons and the Coaches' Poll in 27 seasons. In 1964, the Razorbacks finished #2 in both the AP and Coaches' polls and were named national champions by the Football Writers Association of America, winning the Grantland Rice Trophy. The AP and Coaches' polls voted the Alabama Crimson Tide as their national champion in 1964 at the end of the regular season, but eventually stopped voting for their national champion until after the bowl games because Alabama lost to the Texas Longhorns in the Orange Bowl, a team Arkansas had beaten earlier that year in Austin. Arkansas went on to defeat the Nebraska Cornhuskers in the Cotton Bowl, becoming the only undefeated team left in major college football in 1964.

Seasons

Notes

References

Arkansas

Arkansas Razorbacks football seasons